Scleranthus, the knawels, are a genus of herbaceous plants in the family Caryophyllaceae.

Selected species
Scleranthus annuus L. (German-knotweed, knawel or annual knawel), native to Africa, Europe, Asia and naturalised elsewhere.
Scleranthus biflorus (J.R.Forst. & G.Forst.) Hook.f. (Knawel, cushion-bush or two-flowered knawel), native to Australia and New Zealand
Scleranthus brockiei P.A.Will., native to Australia and New Zealand
Scleranthus diander R.Br. (Tufted knawel), native to Australia
Scleranthus minusculus F.Muell., native to Australia
Scleranthus perennis L. (Perennial knawel)
Scleranthus pungens R.Br., native to Australia  
Scleranthus singuliflorus (F.Muell.) Mattf. (One-flowered knawel), native to higher alpine areas in Australia

References

Further reading

 
 

Caryophyllaceae
Caryophyllaceae genera
Taxa named by Carl Linnaeus